Jammalamadugu revenue division (or Jammalamadugu division) is an administrative division in the Kadapa district of the Indian state of Andhra Pradesh. It is one of the 4 revenue divisions in the district which consists of 7 mandals under its administration.Proddatur is the largest town in jammalamadugu revenue division.

History 

Jammalamadugu is the administrative headquarters of the division.In this division,Proddatur is the old municipality which became municipality in 1915,presently upgraded as a special grade municipality. Pulivendula became municipality in 2008.

Administration 
The 7 mandals in division are:.

See also 
List of revenue divisions in Andhra Pradesh
List of mandals in Andhra Pradesh
Kadapa district
Kadapa revenue division
Badvel revenue division
Pulivendala revenue division

References 

Revenue divisions in Kadapa district
Revenue divisions in Andhra Pradesh